Nina Josie Robertson (born 21 October 1996) is an Australian beauty pageant titleholder who won Miss Earth Australia 2017. She represented Australia at the Miss Earth 2017 pageant in the Philippines.

Life and career

Early life
Robertson is the youngest of the three children to an Australian father and a Filipino mother from Mandaluyong. She can speak English and Filipino. She is currently a college student in the University of Melbourne.

Pageantry

Mutya ng Pilipinas 2015
Robertson previously competed in Mutya ng Pilipinas 2015 pageant held in Resorts World Manila in Pasay, Philippines on August 2, 2015. She was awarded the title Mutya ng Overseas Community being a representative of Overseas Filipinos in Australia.

Miss Earth Australia 2017
Robertson won the title of Miss Earth Australia 2017 against 21 candidates during the pageant finale held in The Grand Ballroom in Crowne Plaza Terrigal in New South Wales on September 2, 2017.

Miss Earth 2017
Robertson represented Australia at the international Miss Earth 2017 pageant in Pasay, Philippines and competed with 84 delegates. She won the elemental title Miss Earth – Air 2017 during the pageant final.

She also bagged the following awards:
 Top 16 for Beauty of Face and Poise (Pre-judging event)
 Top 16 for Intelligence and Environmental Awareness (Pre-judging event)
 Top 16 for Beauty of Figure and Form (Pre-judging event)
  Group 1 Swimsuit Competition

References

External links
 Miss Earth Australia Official website
 Miss Earth Australia 2017

Living people
Miss Earth 2017 contestants
Australian people of Filipino descent
Australian beauty pageant winners
Mutya ng Pilipinas winners
People from Victoria (Australia)
Australian female models
1996 births